Protinopalpa ferreoflava is a moth in the family Crambidae. It was described by Strand in 1911. It is found in Togo.

References

Moths described in 1911
Pyraustinae